Backstreet Boys is the debut studio album by American boy band Backstreet Boys, released on May 6, 1996, by Jive Records in Germany. It was a success, becoming one of the biggest debut albums ever. It contains a number of the band's most memorable singles. All of those singles were later released on the group's second self-titled album, Backstreet Boys (1997), their debut in the United States in 1997, which compiled songs from this album and the band's second international release Backstreet's Back (1997).

The album was first released in Germany on May 6, 1996, where the group was based at the time.  It was then released in Switzerland followed by Austria.

Track listing

Sample credits
"Boys Will Be Boys" contains a portion of the composition "Sing a Simple Song" written by Sly Stone and performed by Sly and the Family Stone.
"Let's Have a Party" contains a portion of the composition "Enjoy Yourself" written by Kenneth Gamble and Leon Huff and performed by The Jacksons.
"Don't Leave Me" contains samples of "Flava in Ya Ear" written and performed by Craig Mack and "Please Don't Go" written by Harry Wayne Casey and Richard Finch and performed by KC and the Sunshine Band.

Notes
 signifies remix and additional production
 signifies co-production

Charts

Weekly charts

Year-end charts

Certifications

Release history

References

Backstreet Boys (International)
Backstreet Boys (International)
Backstreet Boys (International)
Albums produced by Max Martin
Albums recorded at Cheiron Studios
Albums recorded at Polar Studios